Almouzni may refer to:

Cyndi Almouzni, French dance pop singer also known by the mononym Cyndi and as Cherie
Didier Almouzni, French musician best known as drummer and founding member of British power metal band DragonForce